Until 1979 the President of Panathinaikos A.C. was responsible for all the athletic departments. Since 1979 the football club became professional and independent with its own president. The same happened later for the basketball team (1992) and the volleyball team (2001). The following is a list of presidents of Panathinaikos A.C. from the foundation of the club in 1908 to the present day.

As of 2018 Nikos Plitas is the current president.

Gallery

References

Presidents